The Riqueval Tunnel is a -long tunnel on the St Quentin Canal, close to the commune of Bellicourt, in the department of Aisne, France. It connects Bellicourt with Bony. It was constructed as part of the St Quentin Canal between 1801 and 1810, on the orders of Napoleon.

The tunnel remains in use, and can be traversed using a chain boat. Along with the Mauvages tunnel, on the Marne–Rhine Canal, it is one of the last locations in the world where a system of chain towing is still in operation.

It was the longest tunnel in the world until the construction of Biassa II tunnel, La Spezia, Italy.

External links 
 Tour through Riqueval Tunnel Site (French)
 Official site of navigable canals in France (French)
 Photos site (French)
 M. M. PUGIN: L’histoire du Canal de Saint-Quentin Dans: Mémoires numérisés, Tome XXVII, 1982, Page 43-60, PDF
 Video about Riqueval Tunnel and its area (French)

References 

 Der Ort wurde in der Schlacht am Saint-Quentin-Kanal vom 29. September bis 10. Oktober 1918 schwer umkämpft.

Tunnels in France
Canal tunnels in France